Brandt is an unincorporated community in southern Bethel Township, Miami County, Ohio, United States. Brandt is part of the Dayton Metropolitan Statistical Area. The Bethel Township Administration Facility is located in Brandt.

It was formed on the National Road (today U.S. Route 40) as a stop for travelers on the road and for road toll-takers.  It was laid out in 1839 by the Voorhis brothers.  A toll gate was located at the east end of Brandt where US 40 and State Route 201 intersect today. Toll-takers were appointed by the governor and earned $30 a month.

The village is home to the Brandt Methodist Church and the Brandt Lutheran Church (ELCA).  Gethsemane Fellowship Brethren In Christ church is located in the former Bethel Township Grange hall at the northeast corner of St Rt 201 and US 40.  At one time the village had two grocery stores and an active fraternal presence with the Independent Order of Oddfellows being housed in a two-story frame structure. That local organization merged into the I.O.O.F. in nearby Tipp City. It was also the site of the Halderman Nursery.

Brandt School, constructed 1890, still stands on Third Street in the village.

References

Unincorporated communities in Miami County, Ohio
Unincorporated communities in Ohio